Sergio Nelson González (21 March 1961 – 13 July 2020) was an Argentine professional footballer who played as a midfielder.

Career
González joined Belgian First Division side Royal Antwerp in 1984, he went on to score eight goals in forty appearances between 1984 and 1990. During his years with Antwerp, he was loaned out for the 1987–88 Belgian First Division season to Aris of the Greek Alpha Ethniki. Six goals in twenty-seven matches followed. In 1990, González entered Mexican football by joining Atlético Morelia, prior to moves with fellow Mexican Primera División clubs Cobras and Atlante from 1991 to 1993; he suffered relegation with Cobras, while he won the title with Atlante. In 1993, González returned to Argentina to play for Instituto in Primera B Nacional.

In four years with Instituto, González made one hundred league appearances for the club and scored nineteen goals. After departing Instituto in 1997, González subsequently joined Chaco For Ever with whom he featured nine times. Throughout his career, González also played for Argentinos Juniors, Banfield and also had a secondary spell with Instituto in the Argentine Primera División.

Death
Gonzalez died on 13 July 2020 after suffering a heart attack while exercising.

Honours
Atlante
Mexican Primera División: 1992–93

References

External links
Sergio González profile on BDFA's website

1961 births
2020 deaths
Footballers from Córdoba, Argentina
Argentine footballers
Association football midfielders
Argentine expatriate footballers
Expatriate footballers in Belgium
Expatriate footballers in Greece
Expatriate footballers in Mexico
Argentine expatriate sportspeople in Belgium
Argentine expatriate sportspeople in Greece
Argentine expatriate sportspeople in Mexico
Argentine Primera División players
Belgian Pro League players
Super League Greece players
Liga MX players
Primera Nacional players
Argentinos Juniors footballers
Club Atlético Banfield footballers
Instituto footballers
Royal Antwerp F.C. players
Aris Thessaloniki F.C. players
Atlético Morelia players
C.F. Cobras de Querétaro players
Atlante F.C. footballers
Chaco For Ever footballers